Scott Arnold (born 13 March 1965) is an Australian fencer. He competed in the individual épée event at the 1992 Summer Olympics.

References

External links
 

1965 births
Living people
Australian male fencers
Olympic fencers of Australia
Fencers at the 1992 Summer Olympics
Sportspeople from Melbourne
Sportsmen from Victoria (Australia)
20th-century Australian people